Vladimirs Nikonovs (born 1955) is a Latvian politician. He is a member of Harmony and a deputy of the 12th Saeima. He is a member of the Old Believers Russian Orthodox community in Latvia.

External links
Saeima website

References 

1955 births
Living people
People from Rēzekne
Latvian people of Russian descent
Old Believers
National Harmony Party politicians
Social Democratic Party "Harmony" politicians
Deputies of the 10th Saeima
Deputies of the 11th Saeima
Deputies of the 12th Saeima
Deputies of the 13th Saeima
Riga Technical University alumni